The Yanghai leather scale armor is a piece of assyrian styled leather armor that was dated to be from the years 786-543 BCE in northwest China and was manufactured in the neo-assyrian empire. The leathered armor is made up of 5,444 smaller scales with 140 large scales making the total weight of the Yanghai leather scale armor to be 4-5 kg. It was found in 2013 on a possible 30 year old horse rider at the Yanghai cemetery. The armor was a type of scaled armor and is unique due to it being the only complete scale armor of any material. A hypothesis for why this survived for 2,700 year is because the arid climate prevented it from rotting away.  The Yanghai leather scale armor was made from small shield-shaped plates organized in horizontal rows and sewn onto a backing. Because of the expensive supplies, material and laborious manufacturing, armors had been treasured and carrying them was thought of a privilege of the elite. It was uncommon for the  Neo-Assyrian Empire to be buried with the proprietor.

References

East Asian armour
Individual suits of armour
Leather clothing